Phellocalyx is a genus of flowering plants belonging to the family Rubiaceae.

Its native range is Tanzania to Mozambique.

Species
Species:
 Phellocalyx vollesenii Bridson

References

Rubiaceae
Rubiaceae genera
Taxa named by Diane Mary Bridson